Edouard Dubourdeaux or SmithZz is a French former professional Counter-Strike: Global Offensive and former Counter-Strike: Source player.

Career

SmithZz first joined VeryGames back in 2008 and went on to have great success in the Counter-Strike: Source scene through the years. With some on and off time in the French giants, he finally returned in August 2012 to replace Dan "apEX" Madesclaire, and complete the lineup that would around a month later together switch to Counter-Strike: Global Offensive.

He was voted the 17th best CS:GO player of 2013 by HLTV.org.

SmithZz previously joined G2.Kinguin (which later became G2 Esports) and has since then been moved into the coaching role in the '2017 French Shuffle.'

In the 2018 French Shuffle, he was reinstated into a playing role for HIFK Esports as part of Richard 'shox' Papillon's project.

On 26 November 2018, G2 Esports announced the signing of Lucky and JaCkz in replacement of SmithZz and his teammate Ex6tenZ

On 3 February 2020, SmithZz announced his retirement as a professional player and his transition to streaming.

Tournament results
Bold denotes a CSGO Major

VeryGames
 3-4th — 2013 DreamHack Counter-Strike: Global Offensive Championship

Titan
 9-12th — EMS One Katowice 2014

Team LDLC.com
 1st — DreamHack Winter 2014

Team EnVyUs
 3rd — ESL One Katowice 2015

Titan
 9-12th — ESL One Cologne 2014
 13-16th — ESL One Cologne 2015
 9-12th — DreamHack Open Cluj-Napoca 2015

G2 Esports
 9-12th — MLG Major Championship: Columbus
 13-16th — ESL One Cologne 2016
 11-14th — ELEAGUE Season 1
 9-12th — ELEAGUE Season 2
 12-14th — ELEAGUE Major 2017

References

Living people
Counter-Strike players
G2 Esports players
Titan (esports) players
Team Envy players
French esports players
Counter-Strike coaches
Year of birth missing (living people)